Microtes helferi is a species of band-winged grasshopper in the family Acrididae. It is found in western North America.

References

Oedipodinae